Wolfsberg im Schwarzautal is a former municipality in the district of Leibnitz in Styria, Austria. Since the 2015 Styria municipal structural reform, it is part of the municipality Schwarzautal.

References

Cities and towns in Leibnitz District